Marie Elizabeth Sukers (born 18 June 1972) is a South African politician from the Western Cape who has been a Member of the National Assembly of South Africa for the African Christian Democratic Party since May 2019.

Early life and education
In 1991, she achieved a Ministerial Development Diploma from the Rhema Bible Training Centre. She fulfilled a management program at Wits Business School in 2005. Sukers obtained a bachelor's degree in theology from the International School of Ministry (ISOM) in 2018.

Parliamentary career
Sukers was nominated to the National Assembly of South Africa following the general election that was held on 8 May 2019 due to the fact that she was placed second on the ACDP's regional list. She was sworn in as a Member of Parliament on 22 May 2019. On 27 June, she received her committee assignments.

During a debate on gender-based violence in September 2019, Sukers called for the House to forget about politics, and to show leadership in addressing the scourge of violence. She called for a national day of prayer against Gender Based Violence.

Committees
Portfolio Committee on Basic Education
Portfolio Committee on Health (Alternate)
Portfolio Committee on Social Development
Committee for Section 194 Enquiry

References

Living people
1972 births
African Christian Democratic Party politicians
Members of the National Assembly of South Africa
21st-century South African politicians
21st-century South African women politicians
People from the Western Cape
Women members of the National Assembly of South Africa